Abdelhafid Benchabla (born 26 September 1986, in Zemmouri) is an Algerian amateur boxer. He represented Algeria at the 2008 Summer Olympics in Beijing, China, and the 2012 Summer Olympics and is the current World Series of Boxing Light heavyweight champion.

Career 

At the Arab Championships 2007 he lost the semifinal to Mourad Sahraoui. At the 2007 All-Africa Games in Algiers, Benchabla won the silver medal after losing in the final to Ramadan Yasser of Egypt.

In 2008, Benchabla qualified for the 2008 Summer Olympics in Beijing after beating Bastir Samir of Ghana at the AIBA African Olympic Boxing Qualifying Tournament 2008 in Algiers, Algeria. he beat Mourad Sahraoui of Tunisia in the final. At the Olympics he won the rematch with Kassel but lost 7:12 to eventual winner Zhang Xiaoping.

In 2009, Benchabla won silver medal at the 2009 Mediterranean Games in Pescara, Italy, after losing in the light heavyweight final to Bosko Draskovic of Montenegro.

On 28 May 2011, Benchabla qualified for the 2012 Summer Olympics in London after beating Ludovic Groguhe of France in the World Series of Boxing light heavyweight final in Guiyang, China.

At the 2012 Olympics (results) he beat German Enrico Kölling 12-9 then lost to Ukrainian Oleksandr Hvozdyk 17–19, with a controversial two points penalty in the last 5 seconds of the 3rd round.

Chronology 
 2015 – All Africa Games (Brazzaville, CGO) 1st place – 81 kg Won against Abderrahmane Salah Araby (EGY) 2:1 in the final; Won against Kennedy Katende (UGA) 3:0 in the semi-final; Won against Bambo Botumbe (DRC) TKO 1st round in the quarter-final
 2015 – AFBC African Confederation Boxing Championships (Casablanca, MAR) 1st place – 81 kg Won against Abderrahmane Salah Araby (EGY) 3:0 in the final; Won against Hassan Saada (MAR) 3:0 in the semi-final; Won against Mohammed Ali (GHA) TKO 1st round in the quarter-final
 2015 – AIBA Pro Boxing Cycle I Round 2 (Hamburg, GER) – 81 kg Won against Abdelhafid Benchabla (ALG) 3:0
 2015 – AIBA Pro Boxing Cycle I Round 1 (Rome, ITA) – 81 kg Lost to Nikita Ivanov (RUS) 2:1
 2014 – World Series of Boxing Season 2013/2014 Quarter-finals 2nd Leg – 81 kg Won against Teymur Mammadov (AZE) 3:0
 2014 – World Series of Boxing Season 2013/2014 9th Round – 81 kg Won against Oleksandr Ganzulya (UKR) 3:0
 2014 – World Series of Boxing Season 2013/2014 5th Round – 81 kg Won against Michel Borges (BRA) 3:0
 2013 – AIBA World Championships (Almaty, KAZ) 5th place – 81 kg Lost to Julio Cesar De La Cruz (CUB) 3:0 in the quarter-final; Won against Alaaldin Ghossoun (SYR) 3:0 in the second preliminary round; Won against Bosko Draskovic (MNE) 3:0 in the first preliminary round
 2013 – Mediterranean Games (Mersin, TUR) 1st place – 81 kg Won against Abdelkader Bouhenia (FRA) 3:0 in the final; Won against Avni Yildirim (TUR) 3:0 in the semi-final; Won against Gianluca Rosciglione (ITA) 3:0 in the quarter-final; Won against Yahya Mkacheri (TUN) 3:0 in the first preliminary round
 2013 – Giraldo Cordova Cardin Memorial Tournament (Havana, CUB) 9th place – 81 kg Lost to Julio Cesar De La Cruz (CUB) 3:0 in the first preliminary round
 2013 – World Series of Boxing Season 2012/2013 Semi-finals 2nd Leg – 85 kg Lost to Oleksandr Gvozdyk (UKR) by points
 2013 – World Series of Boxing Season 2012/2013 Quarter-finals 1st Leg – 85 kg Won against Mateusz Tryc (POL) by points
 2013 – World Series of Boxing Season 2012/2013 9th Round – 85 kg Won against Ainar Karlson (EST) by points
 2013 – World Series of Boxing Season 2012/2013 7th Round – 85 kg Won against Joseph Ward (IRL) by points
 2012 – World Series of Boxing Season 2012/2013 4th Round – 85 kg Won against Ramezjon Ahmedov (UZB) by points
 2012 – World Series of Boxing Season 2012/2013 1st Round – 85 kg Lost to Sergej Michel (GER) by points
 2012 – London 2012 Olympic Games (London, GBR) 7th place – 81 kg Lost to Oleksandr Gvozdyk (UKR) 19:17 in the quarter-final; Won against Enrico Koelling (GER) 12:9 in the first preliminary round
 2012 – World Series of Boxing Season 2011/2012 Quarter-finals 2nd Round – 85 kg Won against Francisco Ortega (MEX) by points
 2012 – World Series of Boxing Season 2011/2012 10th Round – 85 kg Won against Rahul Kumar (IND) TKO 5th round
 2012 – World Series of Boxing Season 2011/2012 8th Round – 85 kg Won against Ludovic Groguhe (FRA) by points
 2011 – World Series of Boxing Season 2011/2012 5th Round – 85 kg Won against Leonid Charnabayev (BLR) by points
 2011 – World Series of Boxing Season 2011/2012 3rd Round – 85 kg Lost to Ludovic Groguhe (FRA) TKO 2nd round
 2011 – All Africa Games (Maputo, MOZ) 1st place – 81 kg Won against Lukmon Lawal (NGR) 18:8 in the final; Won against Christian Domfack Adjoufack (CMR) 15:4 in the semi-final; Won against Norberto Castro (ANG) RSCI 1st round in the quarter-final; Won against Yahya Mkacheri (TUN) 14:7 in the first preliminary round
 2011 – ITA-ALG Dual Match2 – 81 kg Won against Gianluca Rosciglione (ITA) by points
 2011 – World Series of Boxing Individual Finals (Guiyang, CHN) 1st place – 85 kg Won against Ludovic Groguhe (FRA) by points in the final
 2011 – World Series of Boxing 11th Round – 85 kg Won against Assane Faye (SEN) by points
 2011 – World Series of Boxing 7th Round – 85 kg Won against Ramezjon Ahmedov (UZB) by points
 2011 – World Series of Boxing 5th Round – 85 kg Won against Zhang Wei (CHN) by points
 2010 – World Series of Boxing 4th Round – 85 kg Won against Denis Poyatsika (UKR) by points
 2010 – World Series of Boxing 2nd Round – 85 kg Won against Zhang Wei (CHN) TKO 3rd round
 2010 – Mohamed VI Trophy (Marrakech, MAR) 1st place – 81 kg Won against Amine El-Mohammady El-Alfy (EGY) by points in the final; Won against Ludovic Groguhe (FRA) 3:1 in the semi-final; Won against Yahya Mkacheri (TUN) 4:2 in the quarter-final
 2009 – AIBA President's Cup (Baku, AZE) 7th place – 81 kg Lost to Rizvan Alimuradov (RUS) 12:8 in the quarter-final
 2009 – Tammer Tournament (Tampere, FIN) 1st place – 81 kg Won against Denis Tsaryuk (RUS) 14:4 in the final; Won against Eemeli Katajisto (FIN) 7:3 in the semi-final; Won against Kennedy Katende (SWE) 10:8 in the quarter-final
 2009 – AIBA World Championships (Milan, ITA) participant – 81 kg Lost to Carlos Gongora (ECU) 13:10 in the second preliminary round; Won against Vladimir Cheles (MDA) 20:11 in the first preliminary round
 2009 – AFBC African Continental Championships (Vacoas, MRI) 1st place – 81 kg Won against Charles Ovono Obiang (GAB) RSC 2nd round in the final; Won against Ahmed Saraku (GHA) 8:4 in the semifinal; Won against Rodney Prosper (MRI) 22:3 in the quarterfinal
 2009 – Mediterranean Games (Pescara, ITA) 2nd place – 81 kg Lost to Bosko Draskovic (MNE) 8:4 in the final; Won against Yahya El-Mekachari (TUN) 9:0 in the semifinal; Won against Munaf Assad (SYR) RSC 2nd round in the quarterfinal
 2009 – Ahmet Cömert Tournament (Istanbul, TUR) 3rd place – 81 kg Lost to Artur Beterbiyev (RUS) 8:4 in the semifinal; Won against Yildirim Tarhan (TUR) RSC 2nd round quarterfinal; Won against Jose Angel Larduet (CUB) 8:3 in the first round
 2009 – Algerian National Championships 1st place – 81 kg Won against Samir Masoui (ALG) by points in the final
 2009 – Arab Championships (Cairo, EGY) 1st place – 81 kg Won against Amine Elmohamady Elalfy (EGY) RSC 3rd round in the final; Won against Ahmed Merzouk (KSA) RSC 1st round in the semifinal; Won against Ahmed Suleiman Al-Teimat (JOR) by points in the quarterfinal
 2009 – Chemistry Cup (Halle, GER) 2nd place – 81 kg Lost to Robert Woge (GER) 11:3 in the final; Won against Jasveer Singh (IND) 8:4 in the semifinal
 2008 – AIBA World Cup (Moscow, RUS) 7th place – 81 kg Lost to Dinesh Kumar (IND) 17:11 in the quarterfinal
 2008 – Beijing 2008 Olympic Games (Beijing, CHN) 5th place – 81 kg Lost to Zhang Xiaoping (CHN) 12:7 in the quarterfinal; Won against Ramadan Abdelghafar Anwar Yasser (EGY) 13:6 in the second round; Won against Dinesh Kumar (IND) RSCO 3rd round in the first preliminary round
 2008 – Ahmet Cömert Tournament (Istanbul, TUR) 3rd place – 81 kg Lost to Mehdi Ghorbani (IRN) by points in the semifinal; Won against Asim Iskanderov (AZE) by points in the quarterfinal
 2008 – Coupe des Nations (Calais, FRA) 1st place – 81 kg Won against Yerkebulan Shinaliyev (KAZ) 24:21 in the final; Won against Rene Krause (GER) 20:14 in the semifinal
 2008 – Gee Bee Tournament (Helsinki, FIN) 6th place – 81 kg Lost to Imre Szello (HUN) 17:12
 2008 – Feliks Stamm Tournament (Warsaw, POL) 3rd place – 81 kg Lost to Artur Beterbiyev (RUS) RSC 4th round
 2008 – 1st Africa Olympic Qualification Tournament (Alger, ALG) 1st place – 81 kg Won against Mourad Sahraoui (TUN) WO in the final; Won against Bastie Samir (GHA) 27:8 in the semifinal
 2007 – Pan Arab Games (Cairo, EGY) 6th place – 75 kg Lost to Said Rachidi (MAR) 18:12
 2007 – World Military Games (Hyderabad, IND) 3rd place – 81 kg Lost to Sergey Kovalyov (RUS) 29:8
 2007 – All Africa Games (Alger, ALG) 2nd place – 81 kg Lost to Ramadan Abdelghafar Anwar Yasser (EGY) 18:15 in the final
 2007 – Klichko Brothers Tournament (Kyiv, UKR) 7th place – 81 kg Lost to Hazzam Nabah (QAT) 8:7 in the quarter-final
 2007 – Arab Military Championships (Alger, ALG) 1st place – 81 kg
 2007 – Arab Championships (Aryanah, TUN) 3rd place – 81 kg Lost to Mourad Sahraoui (TUN) by points in the semi-final
 2007 – Algerian National Championships 1st place – 81 kg
 2004 – Algerian Junior National Championships 1st place – 57 kg

References

External links 

 
 
 
 
 Qualifier

1986 births
Living people
Light-heavyweight boxers
Boxers at the 2008 Summer Olympics
Boxers at the 2012 Summer Olympics
Boxers at the 2016 Summer Olympics
Boxers at the 2020 Summer Olympics
Olympic boxers of Algeria
People from Zemmouri
People from Bordj Menaïel District
People from Boumerdès Province
Kabyle people
Algerian male boxers
Mediterranean Games gold medalists for Algeria
Mediterranean Games silver medalists for Algeria
Competitors at the 2009 Mediterranean Games
Competitors at the 2013 Mediterranean Games
African Games gold medalists for Algeria
African Games medalists in boxing
African Games silver medalists for Algeria
Mediterranean Games medalists in boxing
Competitors at the 2007 All-Africa Games
Competitors at the 2011 All-Africa Games
Competitors at the 2015 African Games
Competitors at the 2019 African Games
21st-century Algerian people